Northrop may refer to:

Businesses
 Northrop Corporation, an American aircraft manufacturer formed in 1939
 Northrop Grumman, an American aircraft manufacturer formed in 1994 as a merger of the above company with Grumman
 Northrop Loom, an American designed weaving loom

Places

United States
 Northrop, Minnesota, a town
 Northrop, Minneapolis, Minnesota, a neighborhood
 Northrop Auditorium, on the Minneapolis campus of the University of Minnesota
 Northrop Field, a former stadium for the University of Minnesota
 Northrop High School, Fort Wayne, Indiana
 Northrop University, a former aviation institute
 Mount Northrop, Minnesota

People
 Northrop (surname), including a list of people with the name
 Northrop Frye (1912–1991), Canadian literary theorist
 Suzane Northrop (born 1948), American self-proclaimed psychic medium

See also
 Northrup (disambiguation)